Rietpoort is a settlement in  Matzikama Municipality in the Western Cape province of South Africa.

References

Populated places in the Matzikama Local Municipality